Erzhan Tokotayev (born 17 July 2000) is a Kyrgyzstani footballer who plays for Caspiy in the Kazakhstan Premier League and Kyrgyzstan national football team as a goalkeeper.

Career statistics

International

Statistics accurate as of match played 24 September 2022

References

External links

2000 births
Living people
Sportspeople from Bishkek
Kyrgyzstan international footballers
Kyrgyzstani footballers
Association football goalkeepers
FC Dordoi Bishkek players